Sohanlal Valmik is an Indian politician and a member of the Indian National Congress party from Madhya Pradesh.

Political career
He became an MLA of the Madhya Pradesh Legislative Assembly in 2013.

He has raised various issues in the MP Vidhan Sabha about the appointment of teachers in government schools.

He had also threatened to sit on Dharna.

He supports Congress Party's ideology.

See also
Madhya Pradesh Legislative Assembly
2013 Madhya Pradesh Legislative Assembly election
2008 Madhya Pradesh Legislative Assembly election

References

Madhya Pradesh MLAs 2013–2018
Indian National Congress politicians from Madhya Pradesh
Living people
1963 births